Marguerite Müller-Yao ((25 October 1934 in Peking, Republic of China – 21 September 2014 in Düsseldorf) was a Chinese-German painter and art historian. The aim and main subject of her artistic and scientific works were the cultural relations and influences between China and the West.

Life 
Dr. Marguerite Müller-Yao lived from 1949 to 1964 in Taipei/Taiwan, Republic of China. There she received an education as painter and Calligraph from Pu Ru (Pu Xinyu (溥 心 畬)).

Since September 1964, she lived in Germany. From 1966 until 1974, she studied at the Staatliche Kunstakademie Düsseldorf with Joseph Fassbender (1966–1969) and Gert Weber called Weberg (1969–1974) and passed 1974 the First State Examination for the Arts Teaching Profession. From 1974 until 1977, she was active as a lecturer at the University of Bonn  Studio for Arts Education. Marguerite Müller-Yao received a doctorate (PhD) in 1985 at the University of Bonn with her studies of Arts History, East Asian Arts History and Sinology with Eduard Trier, Eleanor von Erdberg and Rolf Trauzettel and with a dissertation about the Influence of Chinese Calligraphy on Western Informel Painting.

From 1964 until 2012, she also participated as a painter at various national and international art exhibitions.

Exhibitions (selection) 
 1969 Galerie Porta, Wuppertal (Einzelausstellung)
 1971 "Düsseldorf-Stadt der Künstler", Neue Messe
 1968–1977 Winterausstellung Kunstpalast Düsseldorf
 1972 Technische Hochschule Aachen
 1976 Universität Bonn mit CA.Barthelmess
 1976 "Nachbarschaft", Kunsthalle Düsseldorf
 1978–1987 Große Düsseldorfer Kunstausstellung und Jahresausstellungen Düsseldorf. Künstlervereinigungen
 1984–1985 "Salon des Nations", Centre International d'Art Contemporain Paris
 1987 Kanazawa Art Museum Japan
 1996 "Die Düsseldorfer '96" Kunsthalle Düsseldorf
 2000 Musée des Beaux Arts, Tonneins/Frankreich
 2000 Biennale der Zeichnung Pilsen/CZ (Ausstellungsbeteiligungen)

Scientific works 
 Kalligraphie im graphischen Werk von G. Hoehme. In: Katalog G. Hoehme. Kunstmuseum Düsseldorf und Institut für Moderne Kunst Nürnberg, 1975
 Der Einfluss der Kunst der chinesischen Kalligraphie auf die westliche Informelle Malerei. Dissertation Bonn, Köln 1985, 
 Informelle Malerei und chinesische Kalligraphie. In: Informel, Begegnung und Wandel. Schriftenreihe des Museums am Ostwall Dortmund, Band II, Dortmund 2002, S. 322–347.
 The Influence of Chinese Calligraphy on Western Informel Painting, 402 p., 155 Illustrations, Düsseldorf 2015,

Bibliography 

Katalog Ausstellung "Düsseldorf, Stadt der Künstler", Düsseldorf, 1971
Katalog Ausstellung "Düsseldorf, Stadt der Künstler". Düsseldorf 1971.
Günter H. Blecks: Marguerite Hui Müller-Yao. Eine chinesische Künstlerin im Studio für Kunsterziehung. In: Bonner Universitätsblätter. 1975, S. 77–86.
Who is Who in the World. Chicago 1980.
Dictionary of International Biography. Cambridge 1980.
H.J. Orth: Düsseldorf CREATIV. Düsseldorf 1980.
Academia Italia: Artisti Contemporanei. Salsomaggiore/Italien 1982.
Encyclopedia Mondiale degli Artisti Contemporanei. Bologna/Italien 1984.
Who's Who in International Art. Genf/Schweiz 1991.
Grupello-Verlag: Das Künstler-Handbuch, Künstler leben in Düsseldorf. Düsseldorf 1991.
Das Goldene Buch. Nürnberg 1993.
Who is Who in the Arts and Literature. Wörthsee/München 1983.
Art Diary. Mailand (1985–1996).
Allgemeines Lexikon der Kunstschaffenden. Nürnberg 1999.
Dietger Müller: Marguerite Müller-Yao – Eine Chinesische Künstlerin im Westen. Düsseldorf 2015
Dietger Müller: Marguerite Müller-Yao – A Chinese Artist in the West. Düsseldorf 2015.
Rüther, Johannes: Jetzt – Seng-Ts'an: Herz-Geist-Vertrauen. Dortmund 2015.
Rüther, Johannes: Die Präsenz der lebendigen Linie, Von der Kunst der chinesischen Kalligraphie zum freien Malakt. Dortmund 2015.

Chinese calligraphy
Chinese painting
1934 births
2014 deaths
20th-century Chinese painters
21st-century Chinese painters
Art Informel and Tachisme
Chinese art historians
Chinese emigrants to Germany